Glimmande Nymf! blixtrande öga! (Gleaming Nymph, flashing eye!), is a song by the Swedish poet and performer Carl Michael Bellman from his 1790 collection, Fredman's Epistles, where it is No. 72. It is subtitled "Lemnad vid Cajsa Lisas Säng, sent om en afton" (Left by Cajsa Lisa's Bed, late one afternoon), and set to a melody by Egidio Duni. A night-piece, it depicts a Rococo muse in the Ulla Winblad mould, asleep in her bed in Stockholm, complete with allusions to both classical and Nordic mythology.

Bellman's biographer, Paul Britten Austin, calls the song exquisitely delicate. It is innocently worded but clearly erotic; the initial version culminated in an account of orgasm. The mood is conveyed with a description of a rainbow — after sunset, abandoning realism for poetic effect. The melody has been called "languorous and intense".

Context

Song

Music and verse form 

The music is in  time, and is marked Andante. There are three verses of 11 lines each, the final line being repeated da capo to make 12 lines in all. The rhyming pattern is AA-BB-CC-DD-FFF. The melody is an ariette from an opéra comique, Le peintre amoureux de son modèle by the Italian composer Egidio Duni, which in 1782 was translated into Swedish as Målaren kär i sin modell ("The painter in love with his model"). It had the timbre "Maudit Amour, raison severe" ("Cursed Love, severe Reason").

Lyrics 

Although first published in 1790 with the other epistles, Glimmande nymf came to Bellman in 1771, in one of his first attempts at songwriting. The initial version was direct in its description, telling the nymph to "Lay on this chair your robe, trousers, cardigan and skirt". It culminated in an account of the "little death" (orgasm): "Jag leker och tager/ Svimmar, somnar, suckar dör/ Cajsa Lisa mig tillhör." (I play and take/ Faint, fall asleep, sigh, die/ Caisa Lisa belongs to me.) These lines were replaced with a more innocent but still clearly erotic narrative. To convey the desired mood, Bellman creates a rainbow — after sunset: realism is abandoned for poetic effect. Bellman's biographer, Paul Britten Austin, comments that the reader "does not even notice": "Never mind. It is a beautiful scene, even if its chronology calls for much poetic license."

Reception

Britten Austin describes the song as "A lovely night-piece, its exquisite delicacy is best appreciated when considered against the background of its hushed and fragile music." He suggests that although the song names the "nymph" as Caisa Lisa, "one cannot but feel" that the real heroine is Ulla Winblad, who is for example called a nymph in epistle 28. The real Ulla, Maja-Stina Kiellström, aged 27 in June 1771, had become famous as a sexy figure in Bellman's epistles, making her close to unmarriageable, so Bellman found a job for her fiancé, Eric Nordström, and the couple were able to marry.

The scholar of literature Lars Lönnroth writes that the "languorous and intense" melody was originally for an aria about a lover's struggle between the personified "Love" and "Reason". Love draws him to the beloved; Reason tells him he will regret it. He notes that Fredman, too, is pulled to and fro by the same two forces. The "obscene details" of the 1771 version were replaced in the printed 1790 text with a description of the surroundings and a lyricism that at on the surface, he writes, make the song more seemly; the mood is "less burlesque and more inward". The musical setting, too, was changed, removing the instrumental imitation of the action. Still, even without the "erotically arousing striptease", the song's structure was unchanged, and the goddess of love is still present, with "I to Freya's worship go" instead of the frank account of Cajsa Stina as "a diligent temple maid" in Freya's temple, so, Lönnroth writes, it is open to question whether the printed version was much more proper. The retouching, however, in Lönnroth's view converted "a semi-pornographic bedroom farce", including a collapsing bed, to high erotic art complete with Orphean nature-mysticism, making the song "a demonstration of poetry's ability to immortalise".

Bellman's biographer, Carina Burman, writes that the song's lyrical depiction of the delights of sexual intercourse is one of the real jewels of Swedish literature, but that the summer 1771 draft differs markedly from the final version. The first verse invited the nymph to lay her clothes on a chair and fall asleep to "my violin", which Burman describes as phallic, rather than noting prosaically that Norström's wig was hanging on its hook, and inviting Norström's wife to go to sleep to "my music". The second verse, too, is much toned down in the familiar final version. The verse ended not with the account of the rainbow, but with an exhortation to the nymph to open her bed and to hear "my violin, strong as a bassoon". Burman comments that the violin comes out again, strong and erect.

Epistle 72 has been recorded by Fred Åkerström as the title track on his album called Glimmande nymf, and by Cornelis Vreeswijk.

References

Sources

 
 
 
  (contains the most popular epistles and songs, in Swedish, with sheet music)
  (with facsimiles of sheet music from first editions in 1790, 1791)

External links 

 Text of epistle 72
 Stockholms stad:Glimmande Nymf interpreted by Kajsa Grytt
 Costumed version by Thord Lindé

1790 compositions
Swedish songs
Fredmans epistlar